The sixth season of Monk originally aired in the United States on USA Network from July 13, 2007, to February 22, 2008. It consisted of 16 episodes. Tony Shalhoub, Traylor Howard, Ted Levine, and Jason Gray-Stanford reprised their roles as the main characters. A DVD of the season was released on July 8, 2008.

Crew
Andy Breckman continued his tenure as show runner.  Executive producers for the season included Breckman, David Hoberman, series star Tony Shalhoub, writer Tom Scharpling, and Rob Thompson.  NBC Universal Television Studio was the primary production company backing the show.  Randy Newman's theme ("It's a Jungle Out There") was continued to be used, while Jeff Beal's original instrumental theme could be heard in some episodes.  Directors for the season included Randall Zisk, Michael W. Watkins, David Breckman, and Andrei Belgrader.  Writers for the season included Andy Breckman, David Breckman, Jonathan Collier, Hy Conrad, Daniel Dratch, Tom Gammill, Dylan Morgan, Max Pross, Salvatore Savo, Josh Siegal, Joe Toplyn, Tom Scharpling, and Peter Wolk.

Cast

All four main characters returned for the sixth season: Tony Shalhoub as former homicide detective Adrian Monk, Traylor Howard as Monk's faithful assistant Natalie Teeger, Ted Levine as SFPD captain Leland Stottlemeyer, and Jason Gray-Stanford as Lieutenant Randy Disher.

Stanley Kamel returned for his final season as Monk's psychiatrist, Dr. Charles Kroger. After Kamel's death during the hiatus following the sixth season, writers for the seventh season chose to have the character also die of a heart attack. Emmy Clarke continued to portray Natalie's daughter, Julie Teeger, and Sharon Lawrence completed her run as Stottlemeyer's girlfriend, Linda Fusco. Melora Hardin portrayed Trudy Monk, Monk's deceased wife. Ray Porter took over the role of Dale the Whale, a part formerly held by Adam Arkin and Tim Curry. Sarah Silverman returned as Monk's number-one fan and founder of the Monk-o-Philes, Marci Maven after a three season hiatus. Silverman earned an Emmy nomination for this role. Tim Bagley reprised his role as Harold Krenshaw, Monk's number-one rival. Cody McMains also returned for a second appearance as Troy Kroger, Dr. Kroger's teenage son. Larry Miller made a second appearance as Garrett Price, Monk's lawyer, since his first appearance in season 3. Gail O'Grady appeared a second time since the pilot episode, "Mr. Monk and the Candidate", but as a different character, Lovely Rita.

Episodes

Awards and nominations

Emmy Awards
Outstanding Actor – Comedy Series (Tony Shalhoub, nominated)
Outstanding Guest Actress – Comedy Series (Sarah Silverman for playing "Marci Maven" in "Mr. Monk and His Biggest Fan", nominated)

Screen Actors Guild
Outstanding Actor – Comedy Series (Tony Shalhoub, nominated)

References

Monk (TV series)
2007 American television seasons
2008 American television seasons
Monk (TV series) seasons